Chris Henry may refer to:
Chris Henry (wide receiver) (1983–2009), American football wide receiver
Chris Henry (running back) (born 1985), American football running back
Chris Henry (rugby union) (born 1984), Irish rugby union footballer
Chris Henry (DJ), British DJ and producer
Chris Henry (museum curator) (born 1962)